Maria Banuș (born Marioara Banuș; April 10, 1914 – July 14, 1999) was a Romanian poet, essayist, prose writer and translator.

Born into a Jewish family in Bucharest, her parents were Max Banuș, an accountant and later a director at the Carol Street branch of Marmorosch Blank Bank, and his wife Anette (née Marcus). Due to her fragile health, she began primary school with private lessons, taking tests at the Lucaci Street School from 1920 to 1923. She attended high school at the Pompilian Institute from 1923 to 1931, and from 1931 to 1934, studied at the University of Bucharest's faculties of law and literature. She made her published debut as an adolescent, with the poem "14 ani", which appeared in Bilete de Papagal in 1928, under her birth name Marioara Banuș. In 1932, while she was a student, her poems appeared in Zaharia Stancu's Azi magazine, as did her translations from Rainer Maria Rilke and Arthur Rimbaud. It was Stancu who changed her given name to Maria.

Her first book, Țara fetelor, appeared to cordial reviews in 1937. The 1939 Poeme includes selections of her own verses as well as translations from Rilke. At that point, she ceased writing and entered the anti-fascist movement that unfolded under the aegis of the banned Romanian Communist Party, an experience recalled in the diary of which she published fragments in 1977, as Sub camuflaj. The World War II-era Ion Antonescu regime officially banned her entire work as "Jewish". After the war and with the rise of the communist regime, she entered opinion journalism, writing for Gazeta literară, Contemporanul, Steaua and Viața Românească. Her books Bucurie (1949), Despre pământ, (1954), Ție-ți vorbesc, Americă (1955), and Se arată lumea (1956) were expressions of the regime's officially sanctioned socialist realism. These writings brought her prizes and medals, public recognition, publication in schoolbooks and translation into foreign languages, as well as lavish praise from subservient critics such as Dumitru Micu, but also Tudor Vianu. During this period, she translated poets favored by the authorities (Pablo Neruda, Nâzım Hikmet, Nikola Vaptsarov), as well as fine versions of classic authors such as William Shakespeare, Alexander Pushkin and Johann Wolfgang von Goethe. She wrote several short poetry books in the same style: Torentul (1957), Poezii (1958), Magnet (1962), Metamorfoze (1963), and Diamantul (1965).

In the mid-1960s, Banuș underwent a significant break with her earlier style, causing her to re-evaluate her politics as well as the proper role of the artist. The subsequent volumes, starting with Tocmai ieșeam din arenă (1967), Portretul din Fayum (1970) and Oricine și ceva (1972), and through Orologiu cu figuri (1984) or Carusel (1989), showcase some of her recurring themes, but also emphasize the presence of a profoundly altered universe, expressed tragically or playfully and underscoring the extent of her lyricism. Her 1980 Himera includes short evocative prose pieces, essays and confessions; her two plays (Ziua cea mare, 1951; Oaspeți de la mansardă, 1978) are insignificant. She published anthologies of German poetry (1969), modern Austrian poetry (1970) and worldwide love poetry (1974; 1987). She won the Romanian Academy's George Coșbuc Prize in 1949, the State Prize in 1951, the special prize of the Romanian Writers' Union in 1986 and the Herder Prize in 1989.

Banuș died in Bucharest in 1999.

Notes

1914 births
1999 deaths
20th-century Romanian poets
Romanian women poets
Socialist realism writers
Romanian Communist Party politicians
20th-century Romanian dramatists and playwrights
20th-century translators
Romanian translators
English–Romanian translators
French–Romanian translators
German–Romanian translators
Russian–Romanian translators
Translators of William Shakespeare
Translators of Alexander Pushkin
20th-century diarists
Romanian diarists
Romanian anthologists
Jewish Romanian writers banned by the Antonescu regime
Herder Prize recipients
Writers from Bucharest
University of Bucharest alumni